The Cantonal Museum of Fine Arts is an art museum in Lausanne, Switzerland.

Collection
The museum was created by private initiative in 1841, with funds provided by the artist Marc-Louis Arlaud, who became its first curator. Private funds still help the acquisition process with gifts and legacies. In 2014, the museum conserved around 10,000 artworks. A part of them retrace a general history of art, beginning with ancient Egypt, but the largest part focuses on art from the end of the eighteenth century to post-impressionism. The reputation of the museum is due to five great collections : those of Abraham-Louis-Rodolphe Ducros (1748-1810), Charles Gleyre (1806-1874), Théophile-Alexandre Steinlen (1859–1923), Félix Vallotton (1865–1925) and  Louis Soutter (1871–1942).

Modern and contemporary art collections includes works by Marcel Broodthaers, Rolf Iseli, Tadeusz Kantor, Charles Rollier, Daniel Spoerri or Maria Elena Vieira da Silva.

In October 2019, the museum relocated to the new ''Plateforme 10'' facility. This expanded facility allows the museum to further dedicate rooms for its permanent collection.

Gallery

See also 
 List of art museums

Notes and references

External links 

 
 Page on the website of the City of Lausanne

Museums in Lausanne
Art museums and galleries in Switzerland
Museums established in 1841
1841 establishments in Switzerland